HZK may refer to:

 HZK, the IATA code for Húsavík Airport, Iceland
 HZK, the station code for Hazelbrook railway station, New South Wales, Australia